5481 Kiuchi, provisional designation , is a bright binary Vestian asteroid from the inner regions of the asteroid belt, approximately  in diameter. It was discovered on 15 February 1990, by Japanese astronomers Kin Endate and Kazuro Watanabe at Kitami Observatory in Hokkaidō, Japan, and named after their colleague Tsuruhiko Kiuchi. The V-type asteroid has a rotation period of 3.6 hours.

Family and orbit 

Kiuchi is a bright core member of the Vesta family, one of the main-belt's largest families. It orbits the Sun in the inner main-belt at a distance of 2.2–2.5 AU once every 3 years and 7 months (1,307 days). Its orbit has an eccentricity of 0.06 and an inclination of 6° with respect to the ecliptic.

Naming 

Based on a prediction by Brian Marsden, Kiuchi made this rediscovery in 1992, using only binoculars. The approved naming citation was published by the Minor Planet Center on 1 September 1993.

Binary asteroid

Satellite 

In March 2008, a lightcurve of Kiuchi was obtained from photometric observations by astronomers Peter Kušnirák and Petr Pravec at Ondřejov Observatory in the Czech Republic, by Julian Oey at Leura Observatory, Australia, by Robert Stephens at Goat Mountain, California, by Mark Husárik at Skalnaté pleso Observatory, Slovakia, and by Judit Györgyey Ries at McDonald Observatory, Texas.

These photometric observations revealed, that Kiuchi is a synchronous binary asteroid with a minor-planet moon orbiting it every 20.90 hours based on mutual eclipsing and occultation events. The satellite's diameter is about a third of that of Kiuchi, which translates into 1.3 kilometers (secondary-to-primary mean-diameter ratio of ).

Primary 

According to the surveys carried out by PanSTARRS, Kiuchi is a bright V-type asteroid. The Collaborative Asteroid Lightcurve Link assumes an albedo of 0.40 and calculates a diameter of 3.86 kilometers, using an absolute magnitude of 13.676 from Petr Pravec's revised WISE data.

Kiuchi itself has a rotation period of  hours with a small brightness variation of 0.1 magnitude, indicating a nearly spheroidal shape. Photometric follow-up observations by Petr Pravec confirmed the results in 2013 and 2016, giving a period of 3.6198 and 3.6196 hours with an amplitude of 0.08 and 0.1 magnitude, and an orbital period for the satellite of 20.9 and 20.9062 hours, respectively.

Notes

References

External links 
 (5481) Kiuchi at johnstonsarchive, Robert Johnston
 Asteroids with Satellites, Robert Johnston, johnstonsarchive.net
 Asteroid Lightcurve Database (LCDB), query form (info )
 Dictionary of Minor Planet Names, Google books
 Asteroids and comets rotation curves, CdR – Observatoire de Genève, Raoul Behrend
 Discovery Circumstances: Numbered Minor Planets (5001)-(10000) – Minor Planet Center
 
 

005481
Discoveries by Kin Endate
Discoveries by Kazuro Watanabe
Named minor planets
005481
19900215